NGC 388 is an elliptical galaxy located in the constellation Pisces. It was discovered on November 4, 1850, by Bindon Stoney. It was described by Dreyer as "very faint, small, round." Along with galaxies NGC 375, NGC 379, NGC 382, NGC 383, NGC 384, NGC 385, NGC 386 and NGC 387, NGC 388 forms a galaxy cluster called Arp 331.

References

External links
 

0388
18501104
Pisces (constellation)
Elliptical galaxies
004005